Rockcod is a term applied to several unrelated fishes, which all look roughly cod-like and live among rocky habitat. Most are of some importance in fisheries.

In the codling family (Moridae):
 Lotella rhacina, the Rock Cod proper

In the cod icefish family (Nototheniidae)
 Eleginops
 Notothenia
 Paranotothenia
 Trematomus

In the grouper family (Serranidae):
 Epinephelus
 Cephalopholis

"Rockcods" is also an alternate name for the thornyhead family (Sebastidae).